Abraham Jekuthiel Salman ben Moses Joseph Lichtstein was the rabbi of Płońsk in the region of Warsaw, in the eighteenth century. He was the author of a work entitled Zera' Abraham (Dyhernfurth, 1811), a commentary on the Sifre, followed by Biblical and Talmudical indexes, and accompanied with the text. Lichtstein wrote also a preface and added a homily to his son's Shoshannat ha'Amakim.

References
Aaron Walden, Shem ha-Gedolim he-Ḥadash, i.15;
Moritz Steinschneider, Cat. Bodl. col. 699;
Joseph Zedner, Cat. Hebr. Books Brit. Mus. p. 437.

18th-century Polish rabbis
Year of birth unknown
Year of death unknown
People from Płońsk